Best Of Kris Kross Remixed '92 '94 '96 is a remix/compilation album by the hip hop duo Kris Kross. The album has remixes of every hit single from their albums Totally Krossed Out, Da Bomb and Young, Rich & Dangerous apart from "I Missed the Bus" and includes a previously unreleased track entitled "Raide". Guests appearances were made by Redman, Super Cat and DJ Clark Kent.

Track listing
"Jump" (Super Cat Dessork Mix) feat. Supercat
"Warm It Up" (Dupri's Mix) feat. Jermaine Dupri
"It's a Shame (Playin' the Game Mix)"
"The Way of the Rhyme (live)"
"Alright (Humps for Your Trunk Mix)"
"Da Bomb (The Explosive Mix)" feat. Da Brat
"I'm Real (Butcher Mix)"
"Tonite's tha Night " (Kris Kross Redman Remix) feat. Redman
"Live and Die for Hip Hop" (DJ Clark Kent Mix) feat. Da Brat, Aaliyah, Jermaine Dupri, Mr. Black and DJ Clark Kent
"Raide" - (previously unreleased)

Kris Kross albums
Albums produced by Jermaine Dupri
1996 remix albums
Columbia Records remix albums